Mūrmuiža is a village in Valmiera Municipality, Latvia. Mūrmuiža had 497 residents as of 2006.

Gallery

See also 
 Mūrmuiža Manor

References

External links

Towns and villages in Latvia
Valmiera Municipality
Vidzeme